Dates is a British television romantic drama series created by Bryan Elsley, who also created Skins, which first aired on Channel 4 on 10 June 2013, at 22:00 (BST), as part of its "Mating Season" programming, illustrating a series of first dates between online dating service users. The show's target audience is "ABC1".

Plot
Set in London, each episode focuses on one date.

Production
Creator Bryan Elsley conceived the idea of Dates between December 2011 and January 2012, stating "a date is a very complex and grown up interaction between two people. It's a complex language that everyone understands. Everyone knows the difficulty of spending an hour or so in someone's company that you haven't met before. It seemed to be that there was an almost infinite range of possibilities that could flow from that. So dramatically it became very attractive". Dates was commissioned and approved by Channel 4 in September 2012.

Dates was filmed in London during the first quarter of 2013.

Cast
Will Mellor as David
Oona Chaplin as Mia ("Celeste")
Sheridan Smith as Jenny
Neil Maskell as Nick
Ben Chaplin as Stephen
Katie McGrath as Kate
Gemma Chan as Erica
Montanna Thompson as Ellie
Greg McHugh as Callum
Sian Breckin as Heidi
Andrew Scott as Christian
Jamie Di Spirito as Jason

Dates features numerous up-and-coming and more established British and Irish actors and actresses.

To promote the series and to provide further background knowledge, Channel 4 has created a series of fake online dating profiles for each of the main characters.

Episodes

Reception
Dates has been critically well received thus far. Tom Sutcliffe from The Independent wrote, "the writer who wants to leave an impression behind will always be tugged towards a gratifying finish. Credit due to Bryan Elsley, then, for ending the first of Dates, a series of dramas about modern relationships, with an ambiguity".

Of the first episode, Gerard O'Donovan of The Telegraph wrote, "It was enjoyable, I didn't just want more, I couldn't wait to see how successive episodes would link and weave into a format so unforgivingly dependent on great writing and acting. Suffice to say, in a game of snog, marry or avoid, Dates is definitely a keeper".

Lucy Mangan of The Guardian called the first episode "a little nugget of bliss" and commended the show for its realism and its "beauty" in its screenplay and acting.

Paul Naylor of Express & Star deemed that the execution of the first episode was "classy".

Of the first three episodes, The Scotsman wrote, "Elsley is attempting to say something meaningful about the guises we adopt at our most vulnerable and desperate. It's an unedifying portrait of human nature at somewhere near its worst: a cynical blast of rotten candour. Whether Elsley and his fellow writers actually like their characters is a moot point, but I can't deny the voyeuristic impact of these superbly performed chamber pieces".

Writing for The Spectator, Clarissa Tan said that the show's "smartness gets wearying after a while". She criticised episode four on the basis that a lesbian coming out narrative "is quite thin as plots go, but not as thin as the sheets that she and her new lover Kate are under for most of the show". Tan concluded that the characters are "tropes rather than people", "a congregation of characteristic, a multitude of attitudes".

International broadcast
In Australia, the series premiered on 16 February 2015 on BBC First and was watched by 21,000 viewers.

U.S. Ratings
The CW aired nine episodes of the show in 2015.

Season 1

Spin-offs
Entertainment One and Bryan Elsley have partnered to release a companion e-book to the television series.

References

External links

2010s British drama television series
2013 British television series debuts
2013 British television series endings
2010s British LGBT-related drama television series
Lesbian-related television shows
Television shows set in London
Television shows shot in London
Channel 4 television dramas